John Eveleigh may refer to:
John Eveleigh (architect), English surveyor and architect
John Eveleigh (Oriel), English churchman and academic, Provost of Oriel College, Oxford
John Eveleigh (MP), English politician
John Eveleigh (priest), Dean of Ross, Ireland, 1639–1664